The 2013 Big South Conference men's soccer season will be the 30th season of men's varsity soccer in the conference. It will be the final Big South season for VMI, which will return to the Southern Conference in July 2014.

The defending regular season champions are the Coastal Carolina Chanticleers, while the defending tournament champions are the Winthrop Eagles.

Changes from 2012 
No schools entered or left the Big South Conference after the 2012 season, nor did any member school begin or drop men's soccer.

Season outlook

Teams

Stadia and locations

Standings

Tournament

Results

Statistics

References 

 
2013 NCAA Division I men's soccer season